Blokus is an abstract strategy board game for two to four players, where players try to score points by occupying most of the board with pieces of their colour. The board is a square regular grid and the pieces are polyominoes. It was designed by French mathematician Bernard Tavitian and first released in 2000 by Sekkoïa, a French company. It has won several awards, including the Mensa Select award and the 2004 Teacher's Choice Award. In 2009, the game was sold to Mattel.

Gameplay

The game is played on a square board divided into 20 rows and 20 columns, for a total of 400 squares. There are a total of 84 game tiles, organized into 21 shapes in each of four colors: blue, yellow, red, and green. The 21 shapes are based on free polyominoes of one to five squares (one monomino, one domino, two trominoes/triominoes, five tetrominoes, and 12 pentominoes). These shapes are the first in the A000105 sequence.

The standard rules of play for all variations of the game are as follows:
Order of play is based on the color of pieces: blue, yellow, red, green.
The first piece played of each color is placed in one of the board's four corners. Each new piece played must be placed so that it touches at least one piece of the same color, with only corner-to-corner contact allowed — edges cannot touch. Edge-to-edge contact between pieces of different colors, however, is allowed.
When a player cannot place a piece, they pass, and play continues as normal. The game ends when no one can place any more pieces.

Once the game ends, each player counts every square on the piece(s) that they did NOT place on the board, each counting as a negative (−1) point (e.g. an unplayed tetromino is worth −4 points). A player who played all of their pieces is awarded a 15-point bonus. If the last piece played was a monomino, provided that all pieces of own color have been played, the player is awarded a 20-point bonus instead. The player with the highest score wins.

Two- and three-player variations
Blokus rules also allow for two and three player games. In two-player games, each player takes two colors. In three-player games, either one of the players takes two colors or else "the pieces of the fourth color are placed on the board in a non-strategic way."

Variations and spinoffs

Sekkoïa and its distributors manufacture four additional variants of the game.

Blokus Duo
Blokus Duo is for two players only, and uses a smaller (14×14) board; the pieces are opaque with black and white colors (originally translucent with purple and orange colors). The two starting squares are placed, not in the corner (as in the original Blokus game), but nearer to the centre. This makes a crucial difference in the flavour of the game, because players' pieces may (and usually do) touch after the first move. Even more than with the original game, Blokus Duo is an offense-centered game; it is also a much purer strategy game than the four-player game, since one is not in danger of getting ganged up on by three other players (as sometimes happens with the four-player version).

Blokus Trigon

Blokus Trigon uses pieces made up of triangles rather than squares (polyiamonds), and is played on a hexagonal board. This particular variant is optimized for three players, but can be played with 2 to 4 players. The same rules apply, meaning that pieces of the same color are still not allowed to touch each other's edges; however, as it is isometric, a corner touching an edge is allowed.

Blokus Giant/XL
Blokus Giant is a larger version, with the game board being about  square. It was later released by Mattel as Blokus XL.

Blokus Junior
Blokus Junior is targeted at younger children. Like Blokus Duo, it is played by two players on a 14×14 board, but it uses only a subset of the pieces that have simpler shapes. There are 12 unique pieces. Each player gets two of each kind, 24 in total. The game also comes with a set of single-player puzzle sheets, each containing a preset piece position on the board and a set of pieces to place into the board following standard Blokus rules.

Travel Blokus/Blokus To Go!
Travel Blokus was released as the smaller version of Blokus Duo, then re-released as Blokus To Go! with pieces that could be snapped into the board or storage. Travel Blokus was later re-released as the smaller version of the original Blokus game, rather than Blokus Duo.

Blokus 3D

Blokus 3D, originally marketed in a Mayan theme as Rumis, uses pieces made up of unit cubes, in every permutation of three and four cubes in three dimensions. Stefan Kögl created Rumis independently from Bernard Tavitian, and is thus not related. However, Rumis was rebranded into Blokus 3D since the Blokus brand proved stronger than Rumis. There is also a major rule change; instead of being required to place pieces so they touch corner-to-corner, a piece must be placed such that it touches a face of another piece of the same color. Also, a player placing a piece cannot do so if it would create any empty space underneath any part of the piece. The objective is to build one of four different structures, each with its own placement limitations: the Tower, Wall, Steps, and Pyramid. Players attempt to place their blocks to make sure they have as many squares of their color on top of the structure as possible. At the end of the game, the player with the most squares from the top view wins.

Video games
There have been video games based on Blokus. Irem was the first to develop such a kind of video game, in the form of what is known as Blokus Club with Bumpy Trot. Released in Japan in 2005 for the PlayStation 2, and one year later for the PlayStation Portable, the game features characters from Steambot Chronicles (Bumpy Trot in Japan) playing the Classic, Travel, and Duo versions of the game. The game received an international release in 2008, under the name Blokus Portable: Steambot Championship.

Funkitron developed a PC casual game version of Blokus called Blokus World Tour. Released in December 2007, Blokus World Tour was similar to the board game version of Blokus, but also featured 16 AI opponents, music and sound effects, and multiple game modes, including a tour mode, quick play, and a challenge series.

For some time, there was an official online version of Blokus where visitors could play with opponents all over the world. Mattel discontinued the online game on May 18, 2012, stating it did not meet its playability standards.

Gameloft developed and released an official Blokus video game for iPhone, iPod Touch, and iPad in April 2010, featuring the Classic and Duo versions of the game, local and online multiplayer gameplay, and single player tournament mode. The Gameloft version was also released as a digital download game for the PlayStation 3 in December 2010. All editions of the Gameloft Blokus game were discontinued in January 2014.

The most recent officially licensed Blokus app was developed by Magmic, and was available for iPhone, iPod Touch, and iPad. This version included solo play and multiplayer options, integrating the users' Facebook and Game Center friends and allowing them to compete on a tournament leaderboard. The Magmic Blokus game was delisted from the App Store in December 2018.

Clone video games
There are also video games based on Blokus, but not officially licensed. For example, a mobile game app named Quadrus, available since January 2014. Websites such as Pentolla.com and LeFun.fun also include a game based on Blokus, the latter referred to as Bloco.

Open-source derivatives based on the same concept of polyominoes as Blokus also exist, such as: Blokish, Blockem, or Pentobi. Of note, Freebloks 3D is a free desktop version whose online multiplayer is cross-compatible with Freebloks for Android smartphones.

Lastly, one free, closed-source implementation is Blokee, playable immediately on the Web with other players and/or AI, and requiring no software download nor account setup to play.

See also

 Domino
 Pentomino
 Polyomino
 Pseudo-polyomino
 Tetromino
 Tromino
 Tetris

References

External links

 
 Review of Blokus, Blokus Trigon and Blokus Duo at Blokus-Review.com
 Review of Blokus at TheGamesJournal.com

Board games introduced in 2000
Abstract strategy games
Mensa Select winners